The Minnesota Workers' Compensation Court of Appeals (WCCA) is an independent agency of the Minnesota State executive branch. It was created by Minn. Chap. 175A. The WCCA consists of four judges and one chief judge. Each judge is appointed for a six-year term by the governor. Positions are confirmed by the Minnesota Senate.

Judges
The sitting judges include:
 Chief Judge Patricia J. Milun (2011)
 Judge Gary M. Hall (2012)
 Judge Sean M. Quinn (2018) 
 Judge David A. Stofferahn (2002)
 Judge Deborah K. Sundquist (2015)

References

Workers' compensation
Government of Minnesota